Thout 5 - Coptic Calendar - Thout 7

The sixth day of the Coptic month of Thout, the first month of the Coptic year. On a common year, this day corresponds to September 3, of the Julian Calendar, and September 16, of the Gregorian Calendar.  This day falls in the Coptic season of Akhet, the season of inundation.

Commemorations

Feasts 

 Coptic New Year Period

Saints 
 The departure of Isaiah the Prophet, the son of Amoz
 the martyrdom of Saint Basilissa

References 

Days of the Coptic calendar